Timothy Michael Cosgrove (born November 26, 1965) is  a former Democratic member of the Utah State House of Representatives, representing the 44th District from 2005 through 2014.

Early life and career
Born November 26, 1965, Cosgrove is a graduate of Weber State University with a Bachelor of Science degree in political science. He then earned his Master of Arts in Political Management from George Washington University. He currently lives in Taylorsville, Utah and works as a Community Liaison for Salt Lake County.

Political career
Representative Cosgrove was first elected to the Utah State Legislature in 2004 and has served continuously since then. In March 2014 he announced that he would not seek re-election.

His committee assignments as a legislator include Public Education Appropriations Subcommittee; House Transportation Committee; House Revenue and Taxation Committee; House Ethics Committee.

2014 Sponsored Legislation

Representative Cosgrove floor sponsored an additional two bills during the 2014 General Session.

Affiliations
His affiliations include:
 Child Advocate of the Year (2003), Prevent Child Abuse Utah
 Outstanding Efforts Promoting Child Health and Safety (2001), Utah Nurses Association 
 Outstanding Legislative Efforts to Save Lives (2000), Utah Department of Health Bureau of Emergency Medical Services
 Utah State PTA Health Commissioner (2001–2004)
 Utah State PTA Legislative Action Committee (2000–2004).

References

1965 births
Living people
Democratic Party members of the Utah House of Representatives
Weber State University alumni
The Graduate School of Political Management alumni
Place of birth missing (living people)
21st-century American politicians